Zambia–Zimbabwe relations are bilateral relations between Zambia and Zimbabwe, two neighbouring states in Southern Africa.

From 1953 to 1963 they were, along with Nyasaland (now Malawi) part of the Federation of Rhodesia and Nyasaland.

Initially the two countries had good relations after gaining independence. However, relations became strained in 2008 as Zambia, like Botswana, reported similar 'smear campaigns' against the Zambian government by Zimbabwe's state owned media, claiming it was "hired by Britain to press for a speedy regime change in Harare." The foreign affairs minister, Kabinga Pande, said it had lodged a protest against Zimbabwe, against the "sustained malicious campaign against Zambia."

Following the controversial Zimbabwean presidential election of 2008, Zambian President Levy Mwanawasa described Robert Mugabe's Zimbabwe as a "regional embarrassment". Post-2008, tensions thawed with Michael Sata affectionately referring to Mugabe as "Sekuru" in 2013 at a UNWTO event hosted in Victoria Falls.

References

 
Zimbabwe
Bilateral relations of Zimbabwe
Zimbabwe and the Commonwealth of Nations